Gülşat Sahyýewna Mämmedowa (born 1964) is a Turkmen politician and chairperson of the Turkmen Mejlis, the lower chamber of the National Council of Turkmenistan. She was previously deputy chair of the Mejlis. She succeeded Akja Nurberdiýewa.

Biography 
She was born in Ashkhabad, and studied at Turkmen State University, then worked as a researcher from 1988 to 2015. In 2009, she became the Turkmen Minister of Education, following the dismissal of Muhammetgeldi Annaamanov, having previously served as deputy minister. She was herself reprimanded by President Berdimuhamedow in 2012 "for poor performance of official duties" as a result of problems with the examination process, and lost her position in 2015.

In 2016, she became the Deputy Chairman of the Cabinet of Ministers of Turkmenistan for Culture and Media, in which role she announced a competition for young singers and gifted children, and others working in the sphere of the arts, to win a presidential award. She also reported on Turkmenistan Culture Days held in other countries. In greeting his new cabinet in February 2017, President Berdimuhamedow praised the former minister and said that "her experience and knowledge will be used in another important area".

References

1964 births
Living people
Education ministers of Turkmenistan
Members of the Assembly of Turkmenistan
Chairmen of the Assembly of Turkmenistan
Turkmenistan scientists
People from Ashgabat
20th-century women scientists
21st-century women scientists
Women government ministers of Turkmenistan
21st-century Turkmenistan women politicians
21st-century Turkmenistan politicians
Turkmen State University alumni
Women legislative speakers